Dayin may refer to the following locations in China:

 Dayin, Hebei (大因镇), town in Xushui County
 Dayin, Zhejiang (大隐镇), town in Yuyao